The Rector Street station was a station on the demolished IRT Ninth Avenue Line in Manhattan, New York City. It was built in 1874, and had two tracks and two side platforms, though two additional tracks ended at a bumper just south of the station. It was served by trains from the IRT Ninth Avenue Line, and was one block west of Rector Street El Station on the IRT Sixth Avenue Line. In 1918, the IRT extended what is today known as the Broadway–Seventh Avenue Line from Times Square down to South Ferry and built their own Rector Street station as one of the stations, serving as competition for the Ninth Avenue Line station. The el station closed on June 11, 1940. The next southbound stop was Battery Place. The next northbound stop was Cortlandt Street for Ninth Avenue Line trains.

References

IRT Ninth Avenue Line stations
Railway stations in the United States opened in 1874
Railway stations closed in 1940
1874 establishments in New York (state)
1940 disestablishments in New York (state)

Former elevated and subway stations in Manhattan